Muthuranga Mudaliar was a well known freedom-fighter from Nasarath pettai near Poonamallee in Thiruvallur District. He participated in the Quit India Movement in 1942 along with Prakasam, V. V. Giri, M. Bhakthavatsalam, K. Kamaraj and other freedom fighters

References

Indian independence activists from Tamil Nadu